Actinopterygii, members of which are known as ray-finned fishes, is a class of bony fish. They comprise over 50% of living vertebrate species.

The ray-finned fishes are so called because their fins are webs of skin supported by bony or horny spines (rays), as opposed to the fleshy, lobed fins that characterize the class Sarcopterygii (lobe-finned fish). These actinopterygian fin rays attach directly to the proximal or basal skeletal elements, the radials, which represent the link or connection between these fins and the internal skeleton (e.g., pelvic and pectoral girdles).

By species count, actinopterygians dominate the vertebrates, and they constitute nearly 99% of the over 30,000 species of fish. They are ubiquitous throughout freshwater and marine environments from the deep sea to the highest mountain streams. The vast majority of Actinopterygii (~99%) are teleosts.

Characteristics

Ray-finned fishes occur in many variant forms. The main features of  typical ray-finned fish are shown in the adjacent diagram. The swim bladder is the more derived structure.

Ray-finned fishes have many different types of scales; but all teleosts have leptoid scales. The outer part of these scales fan out with bony ridges, while the inner part is crossed with fibrous connective tissue. Leptoid scales are thinner and more transparent than other types of scales, and lack the hardened enamel or dentine-like layers found in the scales of many other fish. Unlike ganoid scales, which are found in non-teleost actinopterygians, new scales are added in concentric layers as the fish grows.

Ray-finned and lobe-finned fishes sometimes possesses lungs used for aerial respiration. Only bichirs retain ventrally budding lungs.

Body shapes and fin arrangements

Ray-finned fish vary in size and shape, in their feeding specializations, and in the number and arrangement of their ray-fins.

Reproduction

In nearly all ray-finned fish, the sexes are separate, and in most species the females spawn eggs that are fertilized externally, typically with the male inseminating the eggs after they are laid. Development then proceeds with a free-swimming larval stage. However other patterns of ontogeny exist, with one of the commonest being sequential hermaphroditism. In most cases this involves protogyny, fish starting life as females and converting to males at some stage, triggered by some internal or external factor. Protandry, where a fish converts from male to female, is much less common than protogyny.

Most families use external rather than internal fertilization. Of the oviparous teleosts, most (79%) do not provide parental care. Viviparity, ovoviviparity, or some form of parental care for eggs, whether by the male, the female, or both parents is seen in a significant fraction (21%) of the 422 teleost families; no care is likely the ancestral condition. The oldest case of viviparity in ray-finned fish is found in Middle Triassic species of Saurichthys. Viviparity is relatively rare and is found in about 6% of living teleost species; male care is far more common than female care. Male territoriality "preadapts" a species for evolving male parental care.

There are a few examples of fish that self-fertilise. The mangrove rivulus is an amphibious, simultaneous hermaphrodite, producing both eggs and spawn and having internal fertilisation. This mode of reproduction may be related to the fish's habit of spending long periods out of water in the mangrove forests it inhabits. Males are occasionally produced at temperatures below  and can fertilise eggs that are then spawned by the female. This maintains genetic variability in a species that is otherwise highly inbred.

Classification and fossil record

Actinopterygii is divided into the classes Cladistia and Actinopteri. The latter comprises the subclasses Chondrostei and Neopterygii. The Neopterygii, in turn, is divided into the infraclasses Holostei and Teleostei. During the Mesozoic (Triassic, Jurassic, Cretaceous) and Cenozoic the teleosts in particular diversified widely. As a result, 96% of living fish species are teleosts (40% of all fish species belong to the teleost subgroup Acanthomorpha), while all other groups of actinopterygians represent depauperate lineages.

The classification of ray-finned fishes can be summarized as follows:

 Cladistia, which include bichirs and reedfish
 Actinopteri, which include:
 Chondrostei, which include Acipenseriformes (paddlefishes and sturgeons)
 Neopterygii, which include:
Teleostei (most living fishes)
Holostei, which include:
Lepisosteiformes (gars)
Amiiformes (bowfin)

The cladogram below shows the main clades of living actinopterygians and their evolutionary relationships to other extant groups of fishes and the four-limbed vertebrates (tetrapods). The latter include mostly terrestrial species but also groups that became secondarily aquatic (e.g. Whales and Dolphins). Tetrapods evolved from a group of bony fish during the Devonian period. Approximate divergence dates for the different actinopterygian clades (in millions of years, mya) are from Near et al., 2012.

The polypterids (bichirs and reedfish) are the sister lineage of all other actinopterygians, the Acipenseriformes (sturgeons and paddlefishes) are the sister lineage of Neopterygii, and Holostei (bowfin and gars) are the sister lineage of teleosts. The Elopomorpha (eels and tarpons) appear to be the most basal teleosts.

The earliest known fossil actinopterygian is Andreolepis hedei, dating back 420 million years (Late Silurian), remains of which have been found in Russia, Sweden, and Estonia. Crown group actinopterygians most likely originated near the Devonian-Carboniferous boundary. The earliest fossil relatives of modern teleosts are from the Triassic period (Prohalecites, Pholidophorus), although it is suspected that teleosts originated already during the Paleozoic Era.

Taxonomy
The listing below is a summary of all extinct (indicated by a dagger, †) and living groups of Actinopterygii with their respective taxonomic rank. The taxonomy follows Phylogenetic Classification of Bony Fishes with notes when this differs from Nelson, ITIS and FishBase and extinct groups from Van der Laan 2016 and Xu 2021.

 Order †?Asarotiformes Schaeffer 1968
 Order †?Discordichthyiformes Minikh 1998
 Order †?Paphosisciformes Grogan & Lund 2015
 Order †?Scanilepiformes Selezneya 1985
 Order †Cheirolepidiformes Kazantseva-Selezneva 1977
 Order †Paramblypteriformes Heyler 1969
 Order †Rhadinichthyiformes
 Order †Palaeonisciformes Hay 1902
 Order †Tarrasiiformes sensu Lund & Poplin 2002
 Order †Ptycholepiformes Andrews et al. 1967
 Order †Haplolepidiformes Westoll 1944
 Order †Aeduelliformes Heyler 1969
 Order †Platysomiformes Aldinger 1937
 Order †Dorypteriformes Cope 1871
 Order †Eurynotiformes Sallan & Coates 2013
 Class Cladistia Pander 1860
 Order †Guildayichthyiformes Lund 2000
 Order Polypteriformes Bleeker 1859 (bichirs and reedfishes)
 Class Actinopteri Cope 1972 s.s.
 Order †Elonichthyiformes Kazantseva-Selezneva 1977
 Order †Phanerorhynchiformes
 Order †Bobasatraniiformes Berg 1940
 Order †Saurichthyiformes Aldinger 1937
 Subclass Chondrostei Müller, 1844
 Order †Birgeriiformes Heyler 1969
 Order †Chondrosteiformes Aldinger, 1937
 Order Acipenseriformes Berg 1940 (includes sturgeons and paddlefishes)
 Subclass Neopterygii Regan 1923 sensu Xu & Wu 2012
 Order †Pholidopleuriformes Berg 1937
Order †Redfieldiiformes Berg 1940
Order †Platysiagiformes Brough 1939
Order †Polzbergiiformes Griffith 1977
Order †Perleidiformes Berg 1937
Order †Louwoichthyiformes Xu 2021
 Order †Peltopleuriformes Lehman 1966
 Order †Luganoiiformes Lehman 1958
 Order †Pycnodontiformes Berg 1937
 Infraclass Holostei Müller 1844
 Division Halecomorphi Cope 1872 sensu Grande & Bemis 1998
 Order †Parasemionotiformes Lehman 1966
 Order †Ionoscopiformes Grande & Bemis 1998
 Order Amiiformes Huxley 1861 sensu Grande & Bemis 1998 (bowfins)
 Division Ginglymodi Cope 1871
 Order †Dapediiformes Thies & Waschkewitz 2015
 Order †Semionotiformes Arambourg & Bertin 1958
 Order Lepisosteiformes Hay 1929 (gars)
 Clade Teleosteomorpha Arratia 2000 sensu Arratia 2013
 Order †Prohaleciteiformes Arratia 2017
 Division Aspidorhynchei Nelson, Grand & Wilson 2016
 Order †Aspidorhynchiformes Bleeker 1859
 Order †Pachycormiformes Berg 1937
 Infraclass Teleostei Müller 1844 sensu Arratia 2013
 Order †?Araripichthyiformes
 Order †?Ligulelliiformes Taverne 2011
 Order †?Tselfatiiformes Nelson 1994
 Order †Pholidophoriformes Berg 1940
 Order †Dorsetichthyiformes Nelson, Grand & Wilson 2016
 Order †Leptolepidiformes
 Order †Crossognathiformes Taverne 1989
 Order †Ichthyodectiformes Bardeck & Sprinkle 1969
 Teleocephala de Pinna 1996 s.s.
Megacohort Elopocephalai Patterson 1977 sensu Arratia 1999 (Elopomorpha Greenwood et al. 1966)
 Order Elopiformes Gosline 1960 (ladyfishes and tarpon)
 Order Albuliformes Greenwood et al. 1966 sensu Forey et al. 1996 (bonefishes)
 Order Notacanthiformes Goodrich 1909 (halosaurs and spiny eels)
 Order Anguilliformes Jarocki 1822 sensu Goodrich 1909 (true eels)
 Megacohort Osteoglossocephalai sensu Arratia 1999
Supercohort Osteoglossocephala sensu Arratia 1999 (Osteoglossomorpha Greenwood et al. 1966)
 Order †Lycopteriformes Chang & Chou 1977
 Order Hiodontiformes McAllister 1968 sensu Taverne 1979 (mooneye and goldeye)
 Order Osteoglossiformes Regan 1909 sensu Zhang 2004 (bony-tongued fishes)
 Supercohort Clupeocephala Patterson & Rosen 1977 sensu Arratia 2010
Cohort Otomorpha Wiley & Johnson 2010 (Otocephala; Ostarioclupeomorpha)
 Subcohort Clupei Wiley & Johnson 2010 (Clupeomorpha Greenwood et al. 1966)
 Order †Ellimmichthyiformes Grande 1982
 Order Clupeiformes Bleeker 1859 (herrings and anchovies)
 Subcohort Alepocephali
 Order Alepocephaliformes Marshall 1962
 Subcohort Ostariophysi Sagemehl 1885
 Section Anotophysa (Rosen & Greenwood 1970) Sagemehl 1885
 Order †Sorbininardiformes Taverne 1999
 Order Gonorynchiformes Regan 1909 (milkfishes)
 Section Otophysa Garstang 1931
 Order Cypriniformes Bleeker 1859 sensu Goodrich 1909 (barbs, carp, danios, goldfishes, loaches, minnows, rasboras)
 Order Characiformes Goodrich 1909 (characins, pencilfishes, hatchetfishes, piranhas, tetras, dourado / golden (genus Salminus) and pacu)
 Order Gymnotiformes Berg 1940 (electric eels and knifefishes)
 Order Siluriformes Cuvier 1817 sensu Hay 1929 (catfishes)
 Cohort Euteleosteomorpha (Greenwood et al. 1966) (Euteleostei Greenwood 1967 sensu Johnson & Patterson 1996)
Subcohort Lepidogalaxii
 Lepidogalaxiiformes Betancur-Rodriguez et al. 2013 (salamanderfish)
 Subcohort Protacanthopterygii Greenwood et al. 1966 sensu Johnson & Patterson 1996
 Order Argentiniformes (barreleyes and slickheads) (formerly in Osmeriformes)
 Order Galaxiiformes
 Order Salmoniformes Bleeker 1859 sensu Nelson 1994 (salmon and trout)
 Order Esociformes Bleeker 1859 (pike)
 Subcohort Stomiati
 Order Osmeriformes (smelts)
 Order Stomiatiformes Regan 1909 (bristlemouths and marine hatchetfishes)
 Subcohort Neoteleostei Nelson 1969
Infracohort Ateleopodia
 Order Ateleopodiformes (jellynose fish)
 Infracohort Eurypterygia Rosen 1973
Section Aulopa [Cyclosquamata Rosen 1973]
 Order Aulopiformes Rosen 1973 (Bombay duck and lancetfishes)
 Section Ctenosquamata Rosen 1973
Subsection Myctophata [Scopelomorpha]
 Order Myctophiformes Regan 1911 (lanternfishes)
 Subsection Acanthomorpha Betancur-Rodriguez et al. 2013
Division Lampridacea Betancur-Rodriguez et al. 2013 [Lampridomorpha; Lampripterygii]
 Order Lampriformes Regan 1909 (oarfish, opah and ribbonfishes)
 Division Paracanthomorphacea sensu Grande et al. 2013 (Paracanthopterygii Greenwood 1937)
 Order Percopsiformes Berg 1937 (cavefishes and trout-perches)
 Order †Sphenocephaliformes Rosen & Patterson 1969
 Order Zeiformes Regan 1909 (dories)
 Order Stylephoriformes Miya et al. 2007
 Order Gadiformes Goodrich 1909 (cods)
 Division Polymixiacea Betancur-Rodriguez et al. 2013 (Polymyxiomorpha; Polymixiipterygii)
 Order †Pattersonichthyiformes Gaudant 1976
 Order †Ctenothrissiformes Berg 1937
 Order Polymixiiformes Lowe 1838 (beardfishes)
 Division Euacanthomorphacea Betancur-Rodriguez et al. 2013 (Euacanthomorpha sensu Johnson & Patterson 1993; Acanthopterygii Gouan 1770 sensu])
Subdivision Berycimorphaceae Betancur-Rodriguez et al. 2013
 Order Beryciformes (fangtooths and pineconefishes) (incl. Stephanoberyciformes; Cetomimiformes)
 Subdivision Holocentrimorphaceae Betancur-Rodriguez et al. 2013
 Order Holocentriformes (Soldierfishes)
 Subdivision Percomorphaceae Betancur-Rodriguez et al. 2013 (Percomorpha sensu Miya et al. 2003; Acanthopteri)
Series Ophidiimopharia Betancur-Rodriguez et al. 2013
 Order Ophidiiformes (pearlfishes)
 Series Batrachoidimopharia Betancur-Rodriguez et al. 2013
 Order Batrachoidiformes (toadfishes)
 Series Gobiomopharia Betancur-Rodriguez et al. 2013
 Order Kurtiformes(Nurseryfishes and cardinalfishes)
 Order Gobiiformes(Sleepers and gobies)
 Series Scombrimopharia Betancur-Rodriguez et al. 2013
 Order Syngnathiformes (seahorses, pipefishes, sea moths, cornetfishes and flying gurnards)
 Order Scombriformes (Tunas and (mackerels)
 Series Carangimopharia Betancur-Rodriguez et al. 2013
 Subseries Anabantaria Betancur-Rodriguez et al. 2014
 Order Synbranchiformes (swamp eels)
 Order Anabantiformes (Labyrinthici) (gouramies, snakeheads)
 Subseries Carangaria Betancur-Rodriguez et al. 2014
 Carangaria incertae sedis
 Order Istiophoriformes Betancur-Rodriguez 2013 (Marlins, swordfishes, billfishes)
 Order Carangiformes (Jack mackerels, pompanos)
 Order Pleuronectiformes Bleeker 1859 (flatfishes)
 Subseries Ovalentaria Smith & Near 2012 (Stiassnyiformes sensu Li et al. 2009)
 Ovalentaria incertae sedis
 Order Cichliformes Betancur-Rodriguez et al. 2013 (Cichlids, Convict blenny, leaf fishes)
 Order Atheriniformes Rosen 1964 (silversides and rainbowfishes)
 Order Cyprinodontiformes Berg 1940 (livebearers, killifishes)
 Order Beloniformes Berg 1940 (flyingfishes and ricefishes)
 Order Mugiliformes Berg 1940 (mullets)
 Order Blenniiformes Springer 1993 (Blennies)
 Order Gobiesociformes Gill 1872 (Clingfishes)
 Series Eupercaria Betancur-Rodriguez et al. 2014 (Percomorpharia Betancur-Rodriguez et al. 2013)
Eupercaria incertae sedis
 Order Gerreiformes (Mojarras)
 Order Labriformes (Wrasses and Parrotfishes)
 Order Caproiformes (Boarfishes)
 Order Lophiiformes Garman 1899 (Anglerfishes)
 Order Tetraodontiformes Regan 1929 (Filefishes and pufferfish)
 Order Centrarchiformes Bleeker 1859 (Sunfishes and mandarin fishes)
Order Gasterosteiformes (Sticklebacks and relatives)
Order Scorpaeniformes (Lionfishes and relatives)
 Order Perciformes Bleeker 1859

References

External links
 
 

Ray-finned fishes
Fish classes
Silurian bony fish
Extant Silurian first appearances